The 1991–92 NCAA football bowl games were a series of post-season games played in December 1991 and January 1992 to end the 1991 NCAA Division I-A football season. A total of 18 team-competitive games, and two all-star games, were played. The post-season began with the California Bowl on December 14, 1991, and concluded on January 18, 1992, with the season-ending Senior Bowl.

Schedule

References